Svatay (Sıbaatay) is a rural locality (a selo), the administrative center of, and one of two settlements in addition to Suchchino in Myatissky 2-y Rural Okrug of Srednekolymsky District in the Sakha Republic, Russia, located  from Srednekolymsk, the administrative center of the district. Its population as of the 2010 Census was 578; down from 615 recorded during the 2002 Census.

References

Notes

Sources
Official website of the Sakha Republic. Registry of the Administrative-Territorial Divisions of the Sakha Republic. Srednekolymsky District. 

Rural localities in Srednekolymsky District